Ngwalwa Village is a village in the Peren district of Nagaland, India. It is located in the Pedi (Ngwalwa) Circle.

Early History of Ngwalwa 

The early history of Ngwalwa is traced back to Gaili Namdi days. 

Ngwalwa Village was founded by Peirieng (Haume). 

After the formation of Village, Haikube (Heuna) of Gaili, who was on his way to settle at Heralwa; was invited by his uncles & elders of Ngwalwa Village in order to complete the rituals. 

Haikube, then settled down at Ngwalwa Village and he was given a land, and it is called as Haikululwa till today.

Location 
Ngwalwa shares its land boundary with the following villages Ndunglwa, Dungki, Benreu, Gaili of Peren district and Ruzaphema. The present Ngwalwa Village is a gateway for many Zeliangrong villages. It is 18 km away from Jalukie Town, 36 km from the commercial town Dimapur and around 70 km from the state capital Kohima.

Demographics 

Apart from the original inhabitants the people permanently residing in Ngwalwa are influx mostly from Zeme villages like Benreu, Poilwa and Ze, plus a small number of Tenyimi tribes.

According to the 2011 census of India, Ngwalwa Village has 1020 people in 289 households (excluding Ngwalwa Town and Heningkunglwa Village, in Ngwalwa). The effective literacy rate (i.e. the literacy rate of population excluding children aged 6 and below) is 80.41%.

Culture and Religion 
The British and the Indian Officers addressed the people of Ngwalwa as Golomi in their written records. The people of Ngwalwa are hill people depending basically on cultivation and livestock-rearing. According to myth, they are brave, courageous and powerful warriors. It is believed that they caught the tiger alive, stopped the jungle wildfires and floods with their mighty strength. 

The people of Ngwalwa recently adopted Christianity. They are mostly of Baptist denomination and a minute of Christian revival, Pentecostal denominations.

References 

Villages in Pedi (Ngwalwa) Circle